Kozany may refer to:
Kożany, Poland
Kožany, Slovakia